San Rafael is a district of the Alajuela canton, in the Alajuela province of Costa Rica.

Geography 
San Rafael has an area of  km² and an elevation of  metres.

Demographics 

For the 2011 census, San Rafael had a population of  inhabitants.

Transportation

Road transportation 
The district is covered by the following road routes:
 National Route 27
 National Route 122
 National Route 124
 National Route 147

Rail transportation 
The Interurbano Line operated by Incofer goes through this district.

References 

Districts of Alajuela Province
Populated places in Alajuela Province